Bombay To Goa, also known as Journey Bombay to Goa: Laughter Unlimited,  is a 2007 Hindi film.  It stars Indian comedians  Sunil Pal, Aasif Sheikh, Raju Srivastava, Ahsaan Qureshi, and comic actors Vijay Raaz, Asrani and Tinnu Anand among others. The film was reportedly financed by Amit Kumar who was arrested for running an illegal kidney sale operation.

Plot
The film revolves around two people. Lal is an ambitious guy who wants to start his own business and make it big in life. Das is a loudmouth, and a very arrogant person. The two manage to get hold of 5100 rupees and they open a vada pav centre. As luck would have it, Lal wins Rs. 2 lakhs in a contest. The duo plan to start a travel agency. Since they do not have enough money to buy a vehicle, they use spare parts of old cars to create a bus. Trusting Das to come up with a good make of a bus, he blindly hands over the prize money to him. Lal manages to get passengers for their first ride. But when their bus arrives, all hell breaks loose with people demanding their money back. But when the passengers are forced to ride in it, it creates a unique experience for them.

The group finds a dying thief and he tells them about a hidden prize with a map. They tear the map and everyone keeps a piece, to work together. However, greed leads to a rat race, but they somehow manage to find gold under a statue which they pulled down, but the gold is seized by the police. After the police are off with the gold, the passengers as well as the bus owner duo begin to repent their greed and decide to do a "philanthropic" job by fixing the fallen statue. But trying to fix the statue they manage to break it into pieces. Inside is a pack of diamonds. Lal thanks God for the reward and everybody gets their share of the diamonds.

Cast
 Sunil Pal as Lal Singh
 Raju Srivastav as Anthony Gonsalves
 Vijay Raaz as Dasa
 Ehsaan Qureshi as Abudul Karim Telgi
 Aasif Sheikh as Dr. Kushal Bhardwaj
 Sudhir Pandey as Charandas
 Anirudh Agarwal as Junglee
 Tinu Anand as Bibhuti Bhushan Banopadhya
 Asrani as Post master
 Birbal
 Dinesh Hingoo as Pakya's Dad
 Jagdeep as Latif Khekada - Husna's dad
 Banwarhlal Jhol as Dhasrat
 Bharat Kapoor as Inspector at Dongri Police Chowki
 Shakti Kapoor as A.C.P Shakti Singh
 Mushtaq Khan as Radha's dad
 Khayali as Pakya
 Viju Khote as Patient in wheelchair
 Sanjay Mishra as Bengali Sardar
 Nafisa as Lajjo V. Kutti
 Paintal	
 Navin Prabhakar		
 Deepak Raja as Aditya Chopra
 Ranjeet as Colonel
 Rakheee as Deepa V. Kutti 
 Sheela Sharma as Pakya's Mom
 Deepak Shirke as Vishwavaram Kunmali Kutti Kutti Kutti / Vetti Kutti Anna

Production
Bombay to Goa is the directorial debut for Raj Pendurkar, who said about the film that it is an out-and-out comedy film with "nothing different", calling it "very basic. It is about regular people, normal people. And we are trying to get humour out of them." Pendurkar said the film is not a remake of the 1972 film of the same name. His cast included several stars from Indian television, and the film was shot in Goa, among other places, in 2006.

Soundtrack
The music was composed by Nitin Shankar, and Ravi Meet, and lyrics were written by Shabbir Ahmed. The soundtrack was released by Eros Music.

Release and reception
The film did not do well commercially. The Tribune gave the film a mixed review, saying it is "overall a fair attempt, but the length of the movie could go against it". Taran Adarsh of Bollywood Hungama gave the film 2 out of 5 stars, calling it "a fair attempt that may appeal to those with an appetite for comic capers". The Times of India was particularly critical of the film, labelling it "a monumental waste" and dismissing the humour as "completely flat". Shubhra Gupta of The Indian Express panned the film, concluding, "Even in terms of low-grade comedy, this is scraping the bottom of the barrel. We left within thirty minutes."

In retrospect, DNA India listed it one of the "disastrous road films" made during the 2000s.

References

External links
 
 
 Bombay To Goa - New at Eros Entertainment.com

2000s comedy road movies
2007 films
Indian comedy road movies
2000s Hindi-language films
2007 comedy films